Suriname participated at the 2017 Summer Universiade which was held in Taipei, Taiwan.

Suriname sent a delegation consisting of only 2 competitors for the event competing in a single sporting event. Suriname didn't claim any medals at the multi-sport event.

Participants

References 

Nations at the 2017 Summer Universiade
2017 in Surinamese sport